ABC 22 may refer to one of the following television stations in the United States affiliated with the American Broadcasting Company:
WJCL, Savannah, Georgia
WKEF, Dayton, Ohio
WVNY, Burlington, Vermont